Shpëtim Selmani (born 1986) is a Kosovan writer and actor. He studied at the University of Prishtina. He has acted on stage at both home and abroad. His books include:

 Shënimet e një Grindaveci (Hot-tempered Notes) in 2015 
 Selected Poems 2010-2017 – Poetry in Time of Blood and Despair (Multimedia, Prishtina) in 2017
 Libërthi i dashurisë (Booklet of Love) published in 2019 by Armagedoni in Prishtina 

Libërthi i dashurisë won the 2020 EU Prize for Literature.

References

Kosovan writers
1986 births
Living people
Date of birth missing (living people)
University of Pristina alumni